Berkeley High School refers to the following high schools:

 Berkeley High School (Berkeley, California)
 Berkeley High School (Moncks Corner, South Carolina)
 Berkeley High School (Berkeley, Missouri)

See also
 Berkley High School, Berkley, Michigan